City International Hospital (abbrev: CiH) is a tertiary care provider in Ho Chi Minh City, Vietnam. Inaugurated in 2014, and located in Bình Tân District, the gateway to Mekong Delta, the hospital has 21 medical specialties and ancillary services, 60 full-time physicians, 500 non-medical staff, serving half a million patient visit a year.

City International Hospital is renowned for its Centre of Excellence in Stroke, General Surgery, Gastroenterology, Obstetrics & Gynecology, Pediatric, Cardiology and Interventional Radiology with Digital subtraction angiography. It has been chosen as one of the international providers in Ho Chi Minh City by the U.S Embassy and Consulate in Vietnam  and cited by the  Voice of America and the USNews  via an interview with Tran Quoc Bao, a top-notch expert  in Healthcare and Medical Tourism in Vietnam, also Planning and Marketing Director of the hospital, as amongst the top medical tourism destinations in Vietnam. City International Hospital is also the first provider in Vietnam to launch a walk-in clinic brand, named Pharmacity - CIH Convenient Care Clinic.

Accreditation
City International Hospital is a member of The Patient Safety Movement Foundation

See also
List of hospitals in Vietnam
 Gia An 115 Hospital, a sister hospital

References

External links

Hospitals in Vietnam
Municipal hospitals